The 1983 CART PPG Indy Car World Series season was the 5th national championship season of American open wheel racing sanctioned by CART. The season consisted of 13 races. Al Unser was the national champion, and the rookie of the year was Teo Fabi. The 1983 Indianapolis 500 was sanctioned by USAC, but an arrangement was made such that it counted towards the CART points championship. Tom Sneva won the Indy 500, after three previous runner-up finishes.

Al Unser jumped out to the early points lead, with second-place finishes in the first three races of the season. Unser finished second at Indianapolis to Tom Sneva, but not without some controversy. Rookie Al Unser Jr. was accused of blocking for his father, but Sneva prevailed, making the winning pass with ten laps to go. Unser won at Cleveland, finished second at the Michigan 500, and third at Road America. After 6 of 13 races, Unser had a 35-point lead over Tom Sneva in the standings.

Rookie Teo Fabi made headlines at Indianapolis, becoming the first rookie to win the pole since 1950. His car dropped out, however, with a failed fuel o-ring. After a mixed start to the year, Fabi's season came alive in July, winning his first career race at the Pocono 500. Fabi jumped from 8th in points to as high as second following his win at Mid-Ohio. Fabi began to whittle away at Unser's point lead. Unser was running consistently, and had no finish worse than 11th.

In the next-to-last race of the season at Laguna Seca, Fabi dominated. He won the pole position and led 95 of 98 laps, winning his third race of the season. With only one race to go, Unser's point lead was down to 15 points. At the season finale in Phoenix, Fabi put in another dominating performance. He won the pole and led 138 of 150 laps. Fabi's championship hopes, however, fell just short as Al Unser came home 4th. Al Unser won the title by a mere 5 points over Fabi.

Other top stories from 1983 included Newman/Haas Racing joining the series with driver Mario Andretti plus a new chassis from Lola, and the rookie debut of Al Unser Jr. Though Unser Jr. did not win any races, he had ten top-10 finishes en route to 7th in points.

Drivers and constructors 
The following teams and drivers competed for the 1983 CART World Series. All competitors utilized Goodyear tires.

Schedule 

Of the notable changes to the schedule, there was the additions of the Caesars Palace Grand Prix which was formally a Formula One championship event and Laguna Seca Raceway. The Mid-Ohio Sports Car Course in Lexington, Ohio returned to the schedule after a 2 year hiatus, and finally starting this season there would only be one race per season at the Milwaukee Mile.

 Oval/Speedway
 Dedicated road course
 Temporary street circuit
 The season-opening Phoenix race was cancelled due to flooding.
 The Riverside race was scheduled for August 28, but pushed a day due to rain.

Season Summary

Race results 

Indianapolis was USAC-sanctioned but counted towards the CART title.

Final points standings

See also
 1982–83 USAC Championship Car season
 1983 Formula Atlantic season
 1983 Indianapolis 500
 1983–84 USAC Championship Car season
 http://www.champcarstats.com/year/1983.htm
 http://media.indycar.com/pdf/2011/IICS_2011_Historical_Record_Book_INT6.pdf  (p. 193-194)

References
 
 
 
 

Champ Car seasons
IndyCar